Petroupim is a municipality and village in Benešov District in the Central Bohemian Region of the Czech Republic. It has about 300 inhabitants.

Administrative parts
Villages of Petroupec and Sembratec are administrative parts of Petroupim.

References

Villages in Benešov District